USS Doherty (DE-14) was an Evarts class destroyer escort constructed for the United States Navy during World War II. She was sent off into the Pacific Ocean to protect convoys and other ships from Japanese submarines and fighter aircraft. She performed escort and antisubmarine operations in dangerous battle areas and returned home safely at war's end.

Namesake
John Joseph Doherty was born on 26 February 1919 in Charlestown, Massachusetts. He enlisted in the United States Naval Reserve on 1 March 1940 and was appointed aviation cadet on 9 July 1940. Assigned to Bombing Squadron 6 on board , Ensign Doherty was reported missing in action 1 February 1942 during the Marshall Islands Raid. He posthumously received a special letter of commendation from the Secretary of the Navy for his devotion to duty and disregard of his own safety in accomplishing his mission in addition to the Distinguished Flying Cross.

Construction and commissioning
The ship, originally intended for transfer to Great Britain, was launched on 29 August 1942 as Berry (BDE-14) by Mare Island Navy Yard; retained for use by the United States Navy; named Doherty on 6 January 1943; and commissioned on 6 February 1943.

World War II service history
After escorting a convoy to Cold Bay, Alaska from 23 April–11 May 1943, Doherty served on escort duty between the west coast and Pearl Harbor from 23 May – 15 September. She sailed from San Francisco, California on 15 September for duty in Alaskan waters where she escorted merchant ships and occasionally served as plane guard for United States Army Air Forces bomber strikes over the Kuriles. Doherty returned to San Francisco for overhaul on 28 September 1944, then sailed to San Diego, California, for training.

Leaving San Diego on 23 November, Doherty operated as a training vessel in submarine exercises at Pearl Harbor from 2 December 1944 – 5 February 1945. She arrived at Guam on 16 February on escort duty and for the rest of the war plied between Guam and Okinawa on escort, patrol and air-sea rescue missions.

Sailing from Guam on 12 October, Doherty arrived at San Pedro, California on 28 October, was decommissioned on 14 December 1945, and sold for scrap on 26 December 1946.

Awards

References

External links

Evarts-class destroyer escorts
World War II frigates and destroyer escorts of the United States
Ships built in Vallejo, California
1942 ships